Monogereion is a genus of Brazilian flowering plants in the tribe Eupatorieae within the family Asteraceae.

Species
There is only one known species, Monogereion carajensis, native to the State of Pará in northeastern Brazil.

References

Eupatorieae
Monotypic Asteraceae genera
Endemic flora of Brazil